Revelation 21 is the twenty-first chapter of the Book of Revelation in the New Testament of the Christian Bible. This chapter contains the accounts of "the new heaven and the new earth", followed by the appearance of the New Jerusalem the Bride.

Text

The original text was written in Koine Greek. This chapter is divided into 27 verses.

Textual witnesses
Some early manuscripts containing the text of this chapter are among others:
Codex Sinaiticus (330–360)
Codex Alexandrinus (400–440)

A new heaven and a new earth (21:1–8)

Verse 1

The Nonconformist minister Alexander Maclaren interprets "a new heaven and a new earth" as meaning "a renovated condition of humanity" and suggests that "and the sea is no more" is "probably ... to be taken in a symbolic sense, as shadowing forth the absence of unruly power, of mysterious and hostile forces, of estranging gulfs of separation". Referring to the island of Patmos where the writer experienced his vision, Maclaren continues, "The sad and solitary and estranging ocean that raged around his little rock sanctuary has passed away for ever".

Verse 2

The name John appears in the King James Version and New King James Version but is generally omitted in other English translations.

Verse 6
 And he said to me, "It is done! I am the Alpha and the Omega, the beginning and the end. To the thirsty I will give from the spring of the water of life without payment."
Whereas in Revelation 16:17 the statement "it is done" (Greek:) signifies 'the completion of the wrath of God', here it is 'at the making of all things new'.

Verse 7
The one who conquers will inherit these things, and I will be his God and he will be my son.

Verse 8
”But cowards, unbelievers, the corrupt, murderers, the immoral, those who practice witchcraft, idol worshipers, and all liars—their fate is in the fiery lake of burning sulfur. This is the second death.”

The new Jerusalem (21:9–27)

Verses 9–11

Verse 14

W H Simcox, in the Cambridge Bible for Schools and Colleges, observes that St John the Apostle (if he was the author) "does not notice his own name being written there".

Verses 15–21
The ground plan of the New Jerusalem is shown to be a square (cf. ), '12000 stadia in each direction' (verse 16), but the general form is actually a 'perfect cube', unlike any 'city ever imagined', but 'like the holy of holies' in the Solomon's temple in Jerusalem, although the New Jerusalem needs no temple (verse 22), because 'the whole city is the holiest place of God's presence'.

Verses 22–27

The description of the New Jerusalem in many ways is in agreement with the models in the Old Testament and apocryphal literature (Isaiah 52:1; ; 60; ; ; ; ; Tobit 13:16–17), except for the absence of a temple in the new city. The New Jerusalem is called in the Book of Ezekiel as 'The Lord is There' (Ezekiel 48:35) and in the Book of Zechariah the whole city is declared as holy as the temple (cf. Isaiah 52:1).

See also
 Alpha and Omega
 Jesus
 John's vision of the Son of Man
 Names and titles of Jesus in the New Testament
 New Earth (Christianity)
 New Jerusalem Dead Sea Scroll
 Related Bible parts: Ezekiel 40, Ezekiel 48, Revelation 1, Revelation 19, Revelation 22

Notes

References

Bibliography

External links
  King James Bible – Wikisource
 English Translation with Parallel Latin Vulgate 
 Online Bible at GospelHall.org (ESV, KJV, Darby, American Standard Version, Bible in Basic English)
 Multiple bible versions at Bible Gateway (NKJV, NIV, NRSV etc.)

21